Emamzadeh Abbas (also Romanized as Emāmzādeh ‘Abbās) is a village in Sajjadrud Rural District, Bandpey-ye Sharqi District, Babol County, Mazandaran Province, Iran. At the 2006 census, its population was 389, in 85 families.

References 

Populated places in Babol County